The 2000 World Badminton Grand Prix Finals was the 18th edition of the World Badminton Grand Prix Finals. The tournament had originally been planned to take place in 2000, but was rescheduled for 2001. Finally, it was held in Bandar Seri Begawan, Brunei, from August 8 to August 12, 2001. The prize money was USD250,000.

Final results

References
Smash: World Grand Prix Finals, Bandar Seri Begawan 2000

World Grand Prix
World Badminton Grand Prix
International sports competitions hosted by Brunei
Badminton tournaments in Brunei
Bad